The  is a line of light-duty commercial vehicles manufactured by Mitsubishi Fuso Truck and Bus Corporation, part of Daimler Truck, subsidiary of Mercedes-Benz Group. The Canter is manufactured since 1963, now in its eighth generation. The Canter is named after the English word describing the gait of a horse, emphasising the 'thoroughbred' nature of Mitsubishi trucks.

Production and sales 
Early export sales began to South East Asia only, but shortly later the series began seeing export to other markets including Australia, New Zealand, the Near East and since the mid-eightys North America. Indonesia (there named "Colt Diesel" until 2022) has become the biggest export market since many years ago, followed by the Near East and Taiwan. In total the Canter is marketed to more than 150 countries. Fuso operates its own factories in Japan, Chennai/India and Tramagal/Portugal, further assemblies from CKD kits exist in Egypt, Portugal, Jakarta, the Philippines, Malaysia, Turkey and Russia. The Tramagal factory supplies to Western Europe (European Union plus Norway and Switzerland) at a local sourcing rate of 50%.

Early after the DaimlerChrysler–Mitsubishi alliance was established the MMC distribution network in Europe was closed and taken over by Daimler. When the alliance failed Daimler already owned the majority in MFTBC and sales rights remained at Daimler.

Product 
At its beginning the Canter was a narrow vehicle with 2 tons of payload. About since the introduction of the fourth generation the line-up of the Canter was increasingly expanded und today the Canter label covers a variety of products. Presumably starting with the fifth generation the JDM Fighter Mignon was sold for Export as "Canter 75", "Canter HD" or "Canter FH", during the seventh generation a twin rear axle Canter was available and since 2018 the Nissan NV350 is exported to the Near East as a Canter Van. Nowadays there are two line-ups in parallel (Eighth generation and General Export Models) each with narrow or wide variants from 3.5 to 8.5 tons gross weight. In Japan the Canter series include the Canter Guts, a 1.5 ton payload truck specially adopted to the rules for the Japanese class of compact vehicles but the term Guts is not always used. Further adoptions exist to local markets including engines and exhaust gas treatments.

In 2010, still with the seventh generation, at Tramagal new more environmentally friendly power trains were introduced with Iveco F1C diesel engines by Fiat Power Train (FPT) and transmissions from ZF Friedrichshafen. The eighth generation fitted with these "World Engines" is determined to developed countries with strict emission limits, furthermore it is available as EcoHybrid and as an all-electric eCanter. For developing countries a simplified version with Mitsubishi engines is available as General Export Modell.

There are several naming systems depending on time and market. E.g., in Japan a Canter 15 is a truck with 1.5 tons payload while pretty much the same truck in Europe was denominated as Canter 35 because of its 3.5 tons gross weight. In Indonesia model names are based on the chassis codes (F codes, e.g. FE71, FE83) opposed to North America where the numerical part of the model name represents the gross weight in hecto pounds (hlb.), e.g. FE130 is a 13,000 lb. truck. Starting with the seventh generation Fuso introduced a naming system similar to that used by parent company Daimler in Europe, in Australia and New Zealand a similar system had been introduced. This system is preferably used here because of its expressiveness (for details see model box of seventh generation).

History

First generation (T720) 

The very first Canter was the successor of the T710 produced from 1960 through 1963. The T720 Canter had two round single headlights but the facelifted version from 1964 had a set of round twin headlights. At a payload of 2 tons it was equipped either with the  KE42 gasoline engine or the  4DQ11A diesel engine.

Second generation (T90) 

The most common diesel version was the T90, available on a short or a long wheelbase. There was also a dual rear wheel version of the long wheelbase model with the T92 chassis code. In July 1970 a 2.7 L  4DR5 diesel option was added.

Third generation (T200) 

The T200 series was structured into the diesel engined T200/T210 (4DR5) and the T205/215 with the 2,315 cc  KE47 gasoline engine, moreover the 1,995 cc  KE42 was still available. In January 1975, the gasoline engines were replaced by the 4G52 (1,995 cc) and 4G53 (2,384 cc). The third generation was sold with various wheelbases and bed heights. A 3-ton payload variant was also available.

Fourth generation 

Starting with the fourth generation in Japan the Canter was supplemented by variants with 2- and 3-ton wide cabins. In February 1980, a power steering for the wide vehicles was added as an option, at the end of the same year a narrow 1.5 ton and a wide 3.5 ton followed. New diesel engines 4D30 (indirect injection, naturally aspirated) and 4D31 (direct injection naturally asparated or turbo charged) were added in November 1982. In December 1983, a "Walk Through Van" with 1.5 tons completed the line-up. All weights mentioned here are payloads.

European sales began in the Benelux countries in the late 1970s. About 200 of the narrow cabined fourth generation Canters had been sold there by 1980, when local assembly of a wide-bodied Canter in Belgium by importer Moorkens N V was begun on a trial basis. The Canter ended up being built in Tramagal, Portugal instead since 1980. Later in October 2004, the factory achieved a production capacity of 15,000 units per year and shift with approximately 430 employees. More than 110,000 vehicles had been produced there since then.

The fourth generation Canter was mostly available with a variety of diesel engines, but a 2555 cc 4G54 petrol inline-four engine producing  was fitted to the FC 35 model.

Fifth generation 
The fifth generation Canter appeared in October 1985. Its overall appearance was more square and smoother than the previous model, while larger, single, rectangular headlights replaced the earlier twin round units. Some export markets, such as the United States, kept using twin round headlights to meet local requirements. In the domestic Japanese market, the front "MMC" emblem was changed to the corporate three diamond logo, with an MMC emblem remaining on the passenger door. Because of its cabin originating from the Canter the Fighter Mignon became marketed outside Japan as a 7.5 ton (gross) Canter 75, Canter HD or FH series. Also new was the adoption of front disc brakes on some models, while the shift lever location was changed from the column to the floor and later to the top of the engine cover between the driver's and the centre seat.

In July 1986, a 4WD option was added to the Canter 20 and Canter 30 series. The lightweight Canter 15 changed its name to Canter Guts (a name only used in the domestic Japanese market) in January 1987. Japanese designations like "Canter 15" indicated the payload (1.5 t) while European designations like "Canter 35" are related to the gross weight.

In November 1989, the Canter underwent a facelift, with a reshaped front grill, and was also able to comply with the new 1989 vehicle emissions regulations. In June 1991 ABS brakes became available, a first for the class in the home market. At the same time, power windows became standard equipment across the board.

In the North American market the Canter was available as the Mitsubishi Fuso FE (Class 3), FG (4WD version of the FE), and FH (Class 5). The FE and FG were both powered by a 
turbocharged and intercooled four-cylinder diesel engine with  while the larger FH had a  six-cylinder turbodiesel.

Sixth generation 
The sixth generation of the Canter war introduced in Japan in November 1993, in Europe in 1996. In November 1995, the line-up was supplemented with variants in standard (narrow) 3.5 tons and wide 4 tons payload. In October 1997, the all-wheel drive of the Guts in Japan was modified from on-demand with crawler to a permanent system. Starting from 2002 all European Canters were permitted to tow trailers up to 3.5 tons gross weight. With a final make-over in 2004, ABS was added to some variants.

In Malaysia this generation was sold from 1996 to 2010. After that, the 7th generation was introduced.

Seventh generation 
The seventh generation of the Canter was introduced in Japan in June 2002, in Europe in 2005. Main goals were a modern vehicle, improved safety (new: disc brakes and Xenon head lights on some models) and comfort, e.g.  the wide cabin became 20 mm higher and 100 mm lengthened to the front. For a more spacious cabin the shifting stick moved from between driver's and center seat to the dashboard, a world-first for cab-over trucks.

Until the end of production of the seventh generation the Canter was manufactured and sold in Japan without Selective catalytic reduction. In Europe the engines of the predecessor had been taken over at first, followed by Mitsubishi engines with common rail injection and finally by modern engines based on the F1C engine by FPT. Starting with the eighth generation these "world engines" were also utilized in Japan and around the world for all developed countries with strict exhaust gas limitation, for less developed countries a simplified seventh generation remained in production in parallel as General Export Models.

In connection to the DaimlerChrysler–Mitsubishi alliance Fuso was hived off from MCC and when the alliance failed remained with Daimler (at that time DCX). Additionally continuously new scandals, i.e. concealment of issues on car safety, came up again and again. Perhaps to fence off from this past the appearance of Fuso trucks was changed gradually: The product name changed from "Mitsubishi Canter" to "Mitsubishi Fuso Canter" on the seventh generation and finally to "Fuso Canter" on the eighth generation, the diamond emblem remained but changed from red to silver.

This generation was introduced to Malaysia in 2010 and was discontinued in 2017.

Eighth generation 

The eighth generation was first introduced in Japan in November 2010, sales started in Europe in 2012. At least in Europe this Canter also succeeds the Mercedes-Benz Vario since its discontinuation in 2013. In Malaysia, this generation was introduced in 2017 and is still in production.

The line-up includes chassis weighting from 3.5 to 8.55 tons gross with cabins 1.7 (S) or 2.0 (W) metres wide. Canters with 5 tons (gross) or less have front axles with independent suspension, selected variants are available with crew cabin (D = Double cabin). Generally, offerings depend widely on the country where done, i. e. no standard (narrow) cabins in the USA nor the U.K. and no standard (narrow) double cabins in Europe. In Australia a 3S13 (locally called 313 City) with reduced cabin height is available. 
Some bodies for the trucks are available ex works (Europe: drop-side and dumper beds, additionally in Japan: D-van, D-wing and reefer boxes, skip and car carriers).

The "world engines" ranging from 96 to 129 kW introduced in Europe with the 7th generation are now utilized worldwide paired to a manual five-speed transmission, the 6-speed Duonic® Dual-clutch transmission is an option for many variants and a PTO is available with both gearboxes. On the Eco-Hybrid a 110 kW diesel engine is combined with a 40 kW electric motor-generator and a 2 kWh lithium-ion battery. Since 2019 the General Export Model is based on the 8th generation, but is fitted with simpler 4V21 engines which are Euro IV compliant only. In late 2017, the first pure electric eCanter was delivered to its customer in New York City. This was the first time the "Canter" designation has been used in North America. Some 500 eCanters were planned for assembly as forerunners to be replaced by mass production starting in 2019.

On October 19, 2020, Fuso introduced a facelifted version of the Canter in Japan. The new line-up includes 1.5 ton payload variants to comply with the Japanese class of compact vehicles/trucks, incorporating the former Canter Guts. Improved engines had already been phased-in in early 2020 offering reduced fuel consumption and exhaust emissions while torque was improved. The engine designation was changed from 4P10 to 4P10+ to underline these innovations.

Derivatives

All-wheel drive 
Since its fifth generation Fuso offered the Canter with all-wheel drive in Japan and probably some export markets. In Europe all-wheel drive became available to selected customers by Pfau in Springe, Germany (since 2016 insolvent) with the seventh generation as standard (narrow) vehicles with 3.5 to 7.5 tons. For the eighth generation Pfau have also offered standard and wide vehicles with 5.5 to 7 tons GVW with all-wheel drive, despite the official European Canter programme only including a 6.5 tons all-wheel drive vehicle. On the eighth generation standard (narrow) cabins have a permanent all-wheel drive without crawling gear while wide cabin trucks feature a rigid front axle and part-time all-wheel drive with raised frame to improve ground clearance resp. approach angles.

Canter Guts 

Guts was the denomination for a JDM variant of the Canter in Japan from 1987 through 2008 having a standard narrow cabin and slightly more than 3.5 tons gross weight.

In 2008 the Guts based on the seventh generation was discontinued but in January 2013 the same label was reinvented following an agreement in late 2012 between Daimler/Fuso and Renault-Nissan to supply each other with certain products, mainly on the Japanese market. Nissan markets the Canter with 2 tons payload or more as a Nissan NT450 Atlas (H44), while Fusō offers a revised variant of the Nissan NT400 (F24) as Canter Guts to fit the Japanese class of compact vehicles.

 Payload limited to 1.5 tons, minimum is 1.15 tons depending on the variant,
 gross weight slightly more than 3.5 tons,
 width reduced to 1.69 m from 1.87 m,
 height reduced to 1.99 m from 2.135 m,
 max. length limited to 4.69 m instead of 4.75 to 6.25 m in Europe,
 ZD30 engine reduced to 81 kW,
 manual 5-speed transmission instead of six speeds,
 various bed heights including reduced tire dimensions on the (driven) rear axle for the low bed variants.
The Canter Guts is powered either by a Nissan ZD30DDTI diesel engine having 81 kW at 2800 rpm and 276 Nm at 1260-2800 rpm or by a petrol engine with a manual 5-speed transmission with overdrive and rear-wheel drive. Options include permanent all-wheel drive and a double cabin. As usual with the other smaller trucks it features independent front suspension.

End of 2019 production of the Nissan NT400 (F24) had been ceased, in early 2020 a rebadged Isuzu Elf has been presented as the new Nissan NT400 (F25). On October 19, 2020, Fuso launched the ninth generation Canter in Japan which now includes variants conforming to the class of compact vehicles. But the Guts label appears no to be utilized any more.

General Export Model 
Continuously stricter exhaust gas limits resulted in raising production cost and complexity, e.g. Common rail injection and exhaust gas aftertreatment. Thus, for less developed countries simplified vehicles with the old Mitsubishi engines and manual 5-speed transmissions (the biggest engine without synchromesh for lowest and reverse gear) were introduced. 
These General Export Models base on the seventh generation Canter, engines comply to EURO II and were sold in parallel to the eighth generation til 2019. Since early 2018 they were offered in the Philippines with more modern Mitsubishi engines conforming to Euro IV. 
In 2019 these vehicles were replaced once more by simplified variants of the eighth generation again equipped with outfashioned Mitsubishi engines (4V21) conforming to EURO IV instead of EURO VI for the FPT engines utilized on the standard eighth generation.

Eco-Hybrid 
Late 2005, the first generation of the "Canter Eco-Hybrid" based on the seventh generation Canter became commercially available in Japan. With a curb weight of 2.83 tons it featured 2 tons of payload, with 3 tons payload the curb weight was slightly higher at 2.87 tons.

The "Eco-Hybrid" based on the eighth generation is a wide 7.5 ton vehicle equipped with a 110 kW diesel engine with Duonic® automated mechanical transmission, 40 kW motor/generator located between engine and transmission and a 2 kWh lithium-ion battery. This parallel hybrid system facilitates 20% lower fuel consumption.

eCanter 

The fully developed eCanter was launched in New York City in September 2017 and is scheduled for delivery in Japan, Europe and North America.

CanterVan 
In 2014 the co-operation between Fuso and Nissan has been extended, on some markets the Nissan NV350 is marketed by Fusō as CanterVan since then.

Buses 

Several bus conversions exist based on Canter chassis including the factory made Fuso Rosa. In many countries locally made buses are a means to circumvent high import duties. In some cases under licence locally made chassis with outdated engines conforming to lower emission standards allow for even lower prices. Some of the seventh-generation Canter FE84 are converted to Transjakarta Minitrans feeder buses by New Armada Carroserie.

Models and Model codes 
Early models utilized the coeval T coding system to distinguish the different versions of trucks, chassis and buses. Starting with the fourth generation it was replaced by the F codes for the same purpose. Over time this in turn has been adapted to newer developments of the product itself. Furthermore, it can easily be confused with some sales denominations in some markets at a given time, e.g. a FC35 decodes as a 3.5 tons (gross) gasoline Canter and the numerical part of the North American FE130 decodes as its gross weight in hectopounds.

Japan
FB Canter Guts Diesel
FD Canter Guts Diesel 4WD
FE
FF Tri-axle (7th generation only)
FG 4WD

North America 

In the mid-1980s Fuso (MMC at that time) started selling the Canter in the USA, originally as the FE. In certain years there was also a medium-duty (Class 5) FH series available which essentially was a Mitsubishi Fuso Fighter Mignon which because of its cabin was grouped as a Canter for Export. In the 2000s the Canter was also sold by Sterling Trucks with "Sterling 360" badging. The Canter nameplate was not used in North America until 2012.

In the United States the 8th generation was offered as FE/FG series (class 3 to 5). Since March 2018, specifically for North America the "Gas Truck" was created featuring the 6.0 Liter GM Vortec V8 small-block engine and an Allison Automatic. It was produced at Freightliner in Gaffney/SC, USA. The all-wheel driven FG series had been discontinued in about 2019, and on May 27, 2020, Mitsubishi Fuso Truck of America announced to cease sales of the Canter in the US and Canada with the exception of Puerto Rico.

In North America the designation had been used on the pure electric eCanter for the first time starting with the first delivery in New York City towards the end of 2017. Some 500 eCanters were planned for pre-production assembly as forerunners to mass production starting in 2019.

Europe

With the fourth generation, sales began in the Benelux countries, and in 1980, local production started in Portugal on a regular basis. Sales designations and programme vary depending on time and country, e.g. no standard/narrow cabins in the U.K.

Due to declining sales resulting from new European driving licences for cars being restricted to 3.5 tons since 1998 the eighth generation 5 to 6 ton Canters are no more available except the 6.5 ton 4x4 and the 6-tonner as being the heaviest standard/narrow cabin Canter.

Turkey 
Produced by Temsa. Over 3500 kg GVWR chassis is also basis of Temsa Prestij light midibus.

Pre-Euro models (1986 - 1997): 
 FE 304 (3500 kg, narrow cab, single wheel only)
 FE 404 (3500 kg, wide cab)
 FE 444 (6500 kg, wide cab with 5-lug wheels, replaced with 6-lug FE 449)

Euro 2 to Euro 4 models (1998 - 2012): 
 FE 511 (3500 kg, narrow cab, optional dual rear wheels, replaced with FE 711)
 FE 515 and FE 519 (3500 kg, narrow cab, long wheelbase)
 FE 730 (3500 kg, narrow cab, long wheelbase)
 FE 639 (3500 kg, wide cab, replaced with FE 839)
 FE 659 (6500 kg, wide cab with long wheelbase option, replaced with FE 859)

Euro 5 and Euro 6 models (2012 - ): 
TF A35 (3500 kg, narrow cab) - (phased out)
TF A35L (3500 kg, narrow cab, long wheelbase) (phased out)
TF B35 (3500 kg, wide cab), -(replaced with 3.5B)
TF B75 (7500 kg, wide cab), -(replaced with 8B)
TF B75L (7500 kg, wide cab, long wheelbase) -(replaced with 8BL with crew cab option)
TF B85 (8550 kg, wide cab) - (replaced with 9B with 9BL long and 9BXL extra long wheelbase options)

Duonic dual clutch transmission is optional for over 3500 kg models unless stated otherwise.

New Zealand
Canter FB, FE, FH
2.0T FE130C1 Super Low
2.0T FE150C1 Wide cab
2.0T FE150E1 Wide Cab
2.5T FG145C1 4x4
3.5T FE150E2 Wide cab
3.5T FE150W1 Double Cab
4.0T FE150G1 Wide Cab
4.5T FE150G2 Heavy Duty Wide Frame

Australia
All models available with either manual or duonic (dual clutch AMT)  transmission, unless stated otherwise.
4x2 Range
413 City (Narrow) Cab SWB
515 City (Narrow) Cab SWB/MWB (Duonic only)
515 City (Narrow) Super Low (low roof model)
515 Wide Cab SWB/MWB
615 Wide Cab MWB/LWB
815 Wide Cab MWB/LWB
918 Wide Cab MWB/LWB/XLWB/XXLWB
Eco Hybrid Range
815 Eco-Hybrid Wide Cab MWB/LWB (Duonic only)
Tipper Range
515 City (Narrow) Cab Tipper SWB
715 Wide Cab Tipper SWB
Crew Cab Range
515 City (Narrow) Crew Cab MWB (Duonic only)
815 Wide Crew Cab MWB (Duonic only)
918 Wide Crew Cab MWB/LWB/XLWB
4x4 Range
715 Wide Cab MWB (Manual only)
715 Wide Crew Cab MWB (Manual only)

Indonesia

In Indonesia, the locally assembled Mitsubishi Fuso Canter was marketed as Colt Diesel until 2022, when the "Canter" nameplate replaced it since then.

4-wheel
FE71
FE71 SUPER CAPACITY
6-wheel
FE73
FE73 SUPER POWER
FE74
FE74 SUPER SPEED
FE74 SUPER POWER
FE75
FE75 SUPER POWER
FE84
FE84 SUPER CAPACITY AND SUPER POWER

Philippines
Canter
FE71
FE73
FE84
FE85

Iran
Mayan Foolad is the official distributor of Mitsubishi Fuso in Iran, and has started its activities since 2016. Canter models to be supplied are FEA51, FEB71CL, FEC71GL and FECX1. Units are all supplied from the Tramagal factory in Portugal. All units are to European specifications and are tested and homologated based on Iranian environment, fuel and topography and are exclusively designed for the Iranian market. All units are supplied with Euro V standard and DPF filter is included in all models. Delivery to customers started in January 2016, and the Canter is to be assembled in Iran from 2017.

Model codes explained 

 2nd digit A to D refer to 1.5 ton payload trucks only and 2nd digit G only for 4-wheel drive only
 4th digit is questionable, e.g. a FE71 in Indonesia has a much higher payload (some 20%) compared to the Philippines.
 5th digit. Given this coding system is universal (as it appears here) where are the codes for older or gas engines, where is the room in this system to give them codes. Why are some engines mentioned twice? This explanation appears to be fairly correct for the 7th generation but no more.
 6th digit: What about a wheel base of 3460mm as seen on the Philippines FG83
 7th digit as a numerical code are most common, they represent chassis cabs, but what do the different numbers mean?

Each Mitsubishi Fuso Canter model code has an average of 4-5 alpha-numeric base model code. Each letter and number corresponds to a particular distinguishing feature.

 1st Digit: "F" stands for Fuso Truck and "B" stands for Bus
 2nd Digit: 
 A = Petrol 2 Wheel Drive
 B = Diesel 2 Wheel Drive
 C = Petrol 4 Wheel Drive
 D = Diesel 4 Wheel Drive
 E = Rear Wheel Drive (4 x 2)
 F = Read Axle Vehicle (6 x 2)
 G = 2 Wheel and 4 Wheel Drive models (does not apply to Guts or Canter Guts)
 3rd Digit: "Odd Numbers" stands for Standard Body and "Even Numbers" means wide body
 4th Digit: the 4th digit corresponds to the maximum payload
 0 to 3 = Maximum Payload of 2 - 3 tons.
 4 = Maximum Payload of 3.5 tons.
 5 = Maximum Payload of 4 - 4.7 tons
 5th Digit: Corresponds to the engine model
 1 = 4D30
 2 = 4M51
 5 = 4D32
 6 = 4D36
 7 = 4D33
 8 = 4D35
 9 = 4D31(T), 4D34(T), or 4D34T4
 5th Digit for 1999 models and above: The model code was checked in 1999 from numeric to alphabet.
 B = 4M42
 C = 4D33
 D = 4M50(T)
 E = 4M51(1) or 4M51(2)
 6th Digit: Corresponds to wheelbase
 B = 2500/2520mm
 C = 2750mm
 E = 3350mm
 F = 3760mm
 G = 3850mm
 7th Digit: Corresponds to the body specification
 D = Dump Truck
 C = Dump Truck 
P = Packer

Thus, the example of "FE305BD" decodes as:

 F = Fuso Truck
 E = Rear Wheel Drive (4 x 2)
 3 = Standard Body
 0 = Maximum Capacity of 3-4 Tons
 5 = 4D32 Engine
 B = 2500/2520mm
 D = Dump -->

See also
List of Low Cab Forward trucks
Mitsubishi Fuso Truck & Bus Corporation
Mitsubishi Fuso Truck of America, Inc.

References

External links

Official UK Canter website
Mitsubishi Canter Dealer East Anglia
Mitsubishi Fuso Japan (second group is Canter's)
Mitsubishi Fuso Canter Worldwide - 1st site, 2nd site
Mitsubishi Fuso Canter USA - FE, FE Crew, FG
Mitsubishi Fuso Canter Europe
Mitsubishi Fuso Canter Australia
Mitsubishi Fuso Canter New Zealand
Mitsubishi Fuso Canter South Africa
Information on Canters in the UK
Mitsubishi Fuso Canter Russia
Mitsubishi Fuso Russia Saint-Petersburg
Mitsubishi Fuso Canter Turkey
Fuso Truck Mongolia

Canter
Cab over vehicles
Vehicles introduced in 1963